David J. Allstot (born January 22, 1947 in Brookings, South Dakota), is a professor of electrical and computer engineering at Oregon State University. His research includes work on analog, mixed-signal, and radio frequency integrated circuits. He was formerly a professor at UC Berkeley and the University of Washington.

Dr. Allstot was elected to serve as president of the IEEE Circuits and Systems Society in 2009, and was for that reason president-elect in 2008.

Dr. Allstot was elected as a member into the National Academy of Engineering in 2020 for his research and commercialization of mixed-mode integrated circuits and systems.

Awards and honors
Allstot received several awards and honors, including:
 In 1980 the IEEE W.R.G. Baker Award
 In 1992 Fellow of the Institute of Electrical and Electronics Engineers (IEEE)
 In 1995 the "Darlington Best Paper Award" from the IEEE Circuits and Systems Society
 In 2020 elected to National Academy of Engineering

References

External links
 OSU EECS: David Allstot
 UWEE: David Allstot
 System-On-Chip Lab: University of Washington
 IEEE Xplore articles by Allstot, D.J.

1947 births
Living people
University of Washington faculty
Oregon State University faculty
University of Texas at Dallas faculty
UC Berkeley College of Engineering faculty
People from Brookings, South Dakota
Fellow Members of the IEEE